Yvonne from Paris is a 1919 American silent comedy film directed by Emmett J. Flynn and starring Mary Miles Minter, Allan Forrest, and Vera Lewis. It was Minter's last film with the American Film Company; she signed a contract with Realart, part of Famous Players-Lasky, in June 1919.

Plot

As described in various film magazine reviews, Yvonne Halbert (Minter) is a dancing girl in Paris. Tired of the overbearing nature of her aunt and manager Marie Provost (Lewis), she runs away to New York, where her aunt has signed a contract for her to perform in a musical comedy production. On the voyage, Yvonne makes enemies with a young woman named Cecile (Theby), and friends with an Italian violinist, Luigi (Warren), with whose family she initially stays when she arrives in New York.

Yvonne makes money at first as a street dancer while Luigi plays his violin, and later she finds work at a cabaret. Here she is spotted by David Marston (Sherry), the producer of the play in which her aunt had signed her to appear. He takes on the young girl as a replacement for his disappeared French star and bills her as Yvonne, ignorant of the fact that she is indeed the real Yvonne. During rehearsals, Yvonne becomes acquainted with the play's writer, Lawrence Bartlett (Forrest), and a romance develops between the two.

Cecile, however, the young woman with whom Yvonne quarrelled on the ship, becomes jealous of Yvonne and tries to usurp her position as the play's star. Cecile's partner Pembroke (Grassby) encourages her to claim that she is the real Yvonne from Paris, and also threatens Yvonne, although she is rescued from his clutches by Bartlett. The truth is revealed when Yvonne's aunt arrives at the theatre and identifies her niece; Cecile is dismissed and Bartlett and Yvonne become engaged.

Cast

Preservation
With no prints of Yvonne from Paris located in any film archives, it is a lost film.

References

Bibliography
 Donald W. McCaffrey & Christopher P. Jacobs. Guide to the Silent Years of American Cinema. Greenwood Publishing, 1999.

External links

Lantern slide with Minter in a wedding dress at ucsb.edu

1919 films
1919 comedy films
1919 lost films
Silent American comedy films
Films directed by Emmett J. Flynn
Films set in New York (state)
American silent feature films
1910s English-language films
Pathé Exchange films
American black-and-white films
Films with screenplays by Joseph F. Poland
1910s American films